These are the international rankings of Poland.

International rankings
The following are links to international rankings of Poland.

References

Poland